Kentucky Route 210 is part of a major route from the Elizabethtown Metropolitan Area to South Central Kentucky region, and in particular to Lake Cumberland and Green River Lake.

From Elizabethtown to Hodgenville, KY 210 is a local use secondary route running next to the four lane KY 61. South of Hodgenville it becomes the primary route to Campbellsville.

Major intersections

References

0210